Taseyevsky District is an administrative and municipal district (raion), one of the forty-three in Krasnoyarsk Krai, Russia. It is located in the south of the krai and borders with Motyginsky and Boguchansky Districts in the north, Abansky District in the east, Dzerzhinsky District in the southeast, Sukhobuzimsky District in the south, and with Bolshemurtinsky and Kazachinsky Districts in the west. Its administrative center is the rural locality (a selo) of Taseyevo. Population:  The population of Taseyevo accounts for 60.6% of the district's total population.

Geography
The district is located on the Taseyeva River.

History
The district was founded on April 4, 1924.

Divisions and government
As of 2013, the Head of the District and the Chairman of the District Council is Oleg A. Nikanorov.

References

Notes

Sources

Districts of Krasnoyarsk Krai
States and territories established in 1924